Glassy Ocean (Japanese: たむらしげる) is a 1998 Japanese animated film directed by Shigeru Tamura. This is Tamura's second animated work following his 1993 short film Ursa Minor Blue (Japanese: 銀河の魚). The film was produced by the studios Project Team Sarah (for the animation), Ai ga areba Daijobu, and Bandai Visual 

Alternative titles: 'Kujira no Chōyaku', 'Kujira no Chouyaku', 'クジラの跳躍', 'The Jump of the Whale'.

Synopsis 
Time has come to a standstill. A whale appears from a glassy ocean and spends half a day soaring gracefully across the skies. The ocean remains in a frozen state as the eccentric individuals who inhabit this land casually wander over it.

Creators

Awards 
1998 - Japan Media Arts Festival grand prize for animation

References

External Links 
Glassy Ocean at IMDb

Glassy Ocean at Letterboxd

Glassy Ocean at MUBI

Glassy Ocean at All Cinema

Glassy Ocean at Anime News Network

Glassy Ocean at Bandai Channel